"Ich hab mich ergeben", originally titled "Gelübde" ("Vow"), is a German patriotic song. The text was written in 1820 by Hans Ferdinand Maßmann. It was one of the unofficial national anthems of West Germany from 1949 to 1952, when the "Deutschlandlied" was officially reinstated. Its tune is now used in the Micronesian national anthem.

History

The national anthem of the Federated States of Micronesia, "Patriots of Micronesia", uses the same tune, as does the Estonian song "Mu Isamaa armas" ("My beloved native land" by Martin Körber) which used to be Estonia's official flag song until 2009 when it was replaced by Gustav Ernesaks's "Mu Isamaa on minu arm" ("My homeland is my love"). The melody is quoted by Johannes Brahms in his Academic Festival Overture. The Deutschlandfunk used the motif to the words "dir Land voll Lieb und Leben" as its interval signal.

The second stanza includes the words "land of the free", similar to the well-known words of "The Star-Spangled Banner", written eight years earlier.

Lyrics
1. Ich hab mich ergeben
mit Herz und mit Hand,
|: Dir Land voll Lieb' und Leben,
mein deutsches Vaterland! :|

2. Mein Herz ist entglommen,
dir treu zugewandt,
|: Du Land der Frei'n und Frommen,
du herrlich Hermannsland! :|

3. Will halten und glauben
an Gott fromm und frei;
|: Will Vaterland dir bleiben
auf ewig fest und treu. :|

4. Ach Gott, tu' erheben
mein jung Herzensblut
|: Zu frischem freud'gem Leben,
zu freiem frommem Mut! :|

5. Laß Kraft mich erwerben
in Herz und in Hand,
|: Zu leben und zu sterben
fürs heil'ge Vaterland! :|
1. I am devoted to you
with heart and with hand,
|: You land full with love and life,
my German Fatherland! :|

2. My hearth is glowing,
loyally turned towards you,
|: You land of the free and faithful,
you glorious Hermann's land! :|

3. I will hold and believe
in God faithfully and free;
|: Will, Fatherland, remain
forever steadfast and loyal to you. :|

4. O God, do raise
my young heart's blood
|: Towards fresh joyful life,
towards free and faithful courage! :|

5. Let strength me gain
in heart and hand,
|: To live and to die
for the holy Fatherland! :|

Melody

"Wir hatten gebauet" 
The music had originally been composed for another patriotic song by August Daniel von Binzer, "Wir hatten gebauet ein stattliches Haus" (1819). Some sources state that in this song the colours Black, Red, and Gold are mentioned for the first time in this order which is not true. In 1817, Binzer had written a different song that begins with the words "Stoßt an! Schwarz-Rot-Gold lebe!" (Let's toast! May Black, Red and Gold live!)

The song's first performance took place on 27 January 1819 after the forced dissolution of the Urburschenschaft. Around one year later, he wrote it down in the register of the participants of the 1817 Wartburg Festival. There, he called the tune a "Thuringian folk song", but no evidence of such earlier melody exists. The lyrics were published for the first time in the Kieler Commers- und Liederbuch in 1821, the tune followed in 1825.

The text refers to the dissolution of the Urburschenschaft ("A noble house") due to the Carlsbad Decrees. During the Vormärz, censorship often replaced the colours with lines.

References

External links 
 
 "Ich hab mich ergeben", text, notes chords; Alojado Lieder Archiv
 "Ich hab mich ergeben", ingeb.org

1819 songs
German songs
1949 establishments in West Germany
1952 disestablishments in West Germany
National symbols of Germany
German patriotic songs
German-language songs
Historical national anthems
Wir hatten gebauet